Kazimierz Lipień (6 February 1949 – 13 November 2005) was a featherweight Greco-Roman wrestler from Poland. He competed at the 1972, 1976 and 1980 Olympics and placed third, first and sixth, respectively. Between 1971 and 1979 he collected 12 medals at the world and European championships, including five gold medals. His twin brother Józef was also an Olympic Greco-Roman wrestler.

Lipień was born in a large family, and besides Józef had four brothers, Edward, Stanisław, Bogdan and Zbigniew, and two sisters, Ewa and Michalina. He graduated from a technical school in 1972, and in 1980 received a coaching degree in Warsaw. In 1981 he moved to Sweden, where he won three national titles (in 1981 and 1985 in Greco-Roman and in 1982 in freestyle wrestling) and trained wrestlers at various clubs for ten years. In 1991 he returned to Poland and headed the national junior wrestling team. He died in the United States, and was survived by wife Antonina and sons Peter and Jacob.

References

External links
 

1949 births
2005 deaths
People from Wałbrzych County
Olympic wrestlers of Poland
Wrestlers at the 1972 Summer Olympics
Wrestlers at the 1976 Summer Olympics
Wrestlers at the 1980 Summer Olympics
Polish male sport wrestlers
Olympic gold medalists for Poland
Olympic bronze medalists for Poland
Olympic medalists in wrestling
Sportspeople from Lower Silesian Voivodeship
Medalists at the 1976 Summer Olympics
Medalists at the 1972 Summer Olympics
20th-century Polish people
21st-century Polish people